The Big Call (formerly known as Fraud Squad), is a 2017 Chinese crime drama film directed by Oxide Pang, starring Cheney Chen, Joseph Chang, Gwei Lun-mei and Jiang Mengjie.

Cast
Cheney Chen as Ding Xiaotian
Joseph Chang as Lin Yahai  	
Gwei Lun-mei as Liu Lifang
Jiang Mengjie as Xu Xiaotu
Jiang Chao
Cheung Siu-fai as Tan Sirong
Tony Ho
John Ching
Ken Lok as Lu Chixiong
Peng Xinchen as Lin Xiaoqin
Zuo Kan as Qiqi

References

External links

2017 crime drama films
Chinese crime drama films
Films directed by Oxide Pang